Hou Yuzhuo (born 14 November 1987 in Zhangjiakou, Hebei) is a female Chinese Taekwondo practitioner. She won gold medal in 2009 Copenhagen World Taekwondo Championship and the silver at the 2012 Summer Olympics.

At the 2012 Summer Olympics in London she defeated American Beijing bronze medalist Diana López in the final seconds in the first round, before beating Suvi Mikkonen in the second round and Marlène Harnois in the semi-final.  She lost 6-4 to Jade Jones in the final.

See also
 China at the 2012 Summer Olympics#Taekwondo
 Taekwondo at the 2012 Summer Olympics – Women's 57 kg

References

 Profile from The-Sports.org

External links
 
 
 
 

1987 births
Living people
Chinese female taekwondo practitioners
Asian Games medalists in taekwondo
Taekwondo practitioners at the 2012 Summer Olympics
Olympic silver medalists for China
Olympic medalists in taekwondo
Sportspeople from Zhangjiakou
Taekwondo practitioners at the 2010 Asian Games
Medalists at the 2012 Summer Olympics
Asian Games silver medalists for China
Medalists at the 2010 Asian Games
Universiade medalists in taekwondo
Universiade silver medalists for China
World Taekwondo Championships medalists
Asian Taekwondo Championships medalists
Medalists at the 2011 Summer Universiade
21st-century Chinese women